Harold Frank Bennett (17 November 1898 – 11 September 1981) was an English actor, active in stage, television and film best remembered for being in sitcoms written and produced by David Croft, having played 'Young Mr. Grace' in the 1970s British sitcom Are You Being Served?, as well as minor character Sidney Bluett in Dad's Army.

Biography
Bennett was born in Hastings, Sussex. After leaving school at the age of twelve, in his early life he toured America as a clown with a circus, and later taught English at the Working Men's College in London. During World War I he served as a courier, initially on horseback, then on motorcycle. After the war he took up acting and eventually worked as stage producer in the Tower Theatre, London. He subsequently pursued a career as a draughtsman for an electric company, only taking up his acting career again following retirement.

Harold Bennett died of a heart attack on 11 September 1981, aged 82. His wife predeceased him in the 1930s; he was survived by their three children. One of his children, John, was also an actor.

Acting career
He played the recurring character Mr (Sidney) Bluett in Dad's Army from 1969 to 1977, but it was as Young Mr Grace, the ancient, amiably callous owner of Grace Brothers department store in British sitcom Are You Being Served? that he achieved his greatest fame. His last appearance in Are You Being Served? aired some three months after his death, having been recorded earlier in the year.

Bennett also played the role of the aged Archdeacon Pulteney in The Stalls of Barchester, the BBC A Ghost Story for Christmas broadcast 24 December 1971 and adapted from the M.R. James story of the same name. Bennett also appeared in Vote, Vote, Vote for Nigel Barton (1965), and in several films, including as a photographer in Games That Lovers Play (1971) and as the aged odd-job man Gasper in The Ups and Downs of a Handyman (1975).

On the stage, he appeared in a Royal Shakespeare Company production of London Assurance, and in an Open University production of Chekhov's The Three Sisters.

Filmography

Film
 The Sky Bike (1967) – Old Man
 Games That Lovers Play (1971) – Old photographer
 Au Pair Girls (1972) – Lord Tryke
 The Ups and Downs of a Handyman (1976) – Gasper
 Are You Being Served? (1977) – Young Mr. Grace

Television

References

External links

1898 births
1981 deaths
English male film actors
English male television actors
People from Hastings
Male actors from Sussex
British Army personnel of World War I
20th-century English male actors
British male comedy actors
British Army soldiers